Loyola University New Orleans College of Law is a private law school in New Orleans, Louisiana affiliated with Loyola University New Orleans. Loyola's law school opened in 1914 and is now located on the Broadway Campus of the university in the historic Audubon Park District of the city. The College of Law is one of fourteen Jesuit law schools in the United States. It is also one of the few law schools in the nation to offer curricula in both Civil Law and Common Law. The school releases several academic journals, most notable of which is the Loyola Law Review.

According to the College of Law's 2013 ABA-required disclosures, 48.8% of the Class of 2013 obtained full-time, long-term, bar passage-required employment nine months after graduation, excluding solo practitioners.

History
The College of Law was founded as the School of Law as one of the earliest academic departments of Loyola University New Orleans, chartered in 1912. Judge John St. Paul was the founding dean, "choosing the faculty and preparing the curriculum". The first session of the School of Law occurred on October 5, 1914; it originally held classes only in the evening and was located downtown at the College of the Immaculate Conception, now known as Jesuit High School. The School of Law was then moved uptown to the St. Charles Avenue campus of Loyola in 1915. In 1925, the law school opened a day division to better serve the needs of its students, as the coursework was expanded to a four-year program. In 1931, the law school became a member of the American Bar Association and became a member of the Association of American Law Schools in 1934. In 1986, the law school moved from the main campus to its current location on the Broadway Campus, only a few blocks away (located on the west side of the Audubon Park).

The School of Law was renamed the College of Law with the passage of the PATHWAYS Plan on May 19, 2006. In 2007, the law school completed a new four-story  addition to its current building, which increased the number of classrooms, office space and library space.

Ranking
According to the law professor blog, The Faculty Lounge, based on 2012 ABA data, only 48.6% of graduates obtained full-time, long term, bar admission required positions (i.e., jobs as lawyers), 9 months after graduation, ranking 135th out of 197 law schools.

Academics
The school is known for its success in national and international moot court competitions. The College houses the Gillis Long Poverty Law Center, a legal research and education center; William P. Quigley is the current Director.

The school's Sports and Entertainment Law Society provides students interested in legal careers in music, film, and sports with unique opportunities to meet and learn from experts in these respective areas. The school also runs the Stuart H. Smith Law Clinic and Center For Social Justice, where students are admitted to the limited practice of law under a supervising attorney's license for their 3L year.  Through the Clinic, students are able to work in a variety of practice areas including criminal defense, prosecution, family law, employment law, immigration, and mediation and arbitration.

Study abroad programs
Loyola Law has had a long history of contacts with civil law schools in other parts of the world. As a result, Loyola has one of the most extensive catalog of study abroad programs in the country. These programs draw students from many other law schools in the country. With the school's special focus on the study of international law, over the course of the years, programs have established in the following countries:  
Budapest, Hungary  
Moscow, Russia 
Panama City, Panama 
Rio de Janeiro, Brazil  - inactive until summer 2017
Spetses, Greece 
Vienna, Austria

Employment prospects
According to Loyola University New Orleans College of Law's official 2013 ABA-required disclosures, 48.8% of the Class of 2013 obtained full-time, long-term, bar passage-required employment nine months after graduation, excluding solo-practitioners. The College of Law's Law School Transparency under-employment score is 33.2%, indicating the percentage of the Class of 2013 unemployed, pursuing an additional degree, or working in a non-professional, short-term, or part-time job nine months after graduation.

Costs
The total cost of attendance (indicating the cost of tuition, fees, and living expenses) at the College of Law for full-time students not living at home for the 2013-2014 academic year is $64,132. The Law School Transparency estimated debt-financed cost of attendance for three years is $253,149.

Notable alumni

Robert A. Ainsworth Jr. (L '32), former Louisiana state senator 1952-1961, serving as President pro tem from 1952–56 and from 1960–61, former federal judge for the United States District Court for the Eastern District of Louisiana from 1961-1966, and former federal judge for the United States Court of Appeals for the Fifth Circuit from 1966-1981
Carl Barbier (L '70), federal judge, United States District Court for the Eastern District of Louisiana
Edward S. Bopp (L '63 and '67), state representative for Orleans and St. Bernard parishes from 1977 to 1984
Henry Braden (L '75), state senator from Orleans Parish and African Americans' rights activist
Phillip D. Brady (L '76), former Deputy Assistant to the President and Director of Cabinet Affairs at the White House
 Armand Brinkhaus (L '60), former member of both houses of the Louisiana State Legislature from St. Landry Parish
 Anh "Joseph" Cao (L '00), first Vietnamese-American elected to the United States Congress
 Pascal F. Calogero Jr. (L '54), former Chief Justice of the Louisiana Supreme Court
 Dan Claitor (L '87), member of the Louisiana State Senate from Baton Rouge
Patrick Connick (L '93), state representative from Jefferson Parish
 Dana Douglas (L '00),  Circuit Judge of the United States Court of Appeals for the Fifth Circuit; former magistrate judge of the United States District Court for the Eastern District of Louisiana
 Hunt Downer (L '72), Former Speaker of the Louisiana House of Representatives; assistant adjutant general of the Louisiana National Guard
 James U. Downs (L '66), senior resident superior court judge in western North Carolina, 1983-2013
John B. Dunlap III (L '89), Brigadier General of the Louisiana National Guard
 Adrian G. Duplantier (L '49), former State Senator and Federal Judge of the United States District Court for the Eastern District of Louisiana
 Duane A. Evans (L '95), Interim United States Attorney for the Eastern District of Louisiana
Robert Faucheux, attorney in LaPlace; former member of the Louisiana House for St. John the Baptist and St. James parishes, 1996 to 2004 
 Charles Foti (L '65),  former Attorney General of Louisiana
 Edwin Foulke (L '78), United States Assistant Secretary of Labor
 Norman Francis (L '55), current President of Xavier University and Presidential Medal of Freedom recipient; first African American to enroll at Loyola Law.
 Kim Gandy (L '78), current President of the National Organization for Women (NOW)
 Ray Garofalo, current member of the Louisiana House of Representatives from St. Bernard Parish
 Robert T. Garrity Jr., state representative for Jefferson Parish District 79, 1988 to 1992
 James Garvey Jr. (L '91), Metairie lawyer and accountant; member of the Louisiana Board of Elementary and Secondary Education
 James T. Genovese (L '74), Associate Justice of the Louisiana Supreme Court
 E. W. Gravolet, member of both houses of the Louisiana State Legislature from Plaquemines Parish
 Charles Grisbaum Jr. (L, '61), state representative for Jefferson Parish, 1972-1982; state appeals court judge, 1982-2001
 William J. Guste (L, '44), state senator from 1968 to 1972 and Louisiana Attorney General from 1972 to 1992
 Richard T. Haik (L), U. S. District Judge in Lafayette
 Ted Haik (L), former state representative from Iberia parish, current city attorney in New Iberia
 Calvin Johnson (L '78), former chief judge of the Criminal District Court of New Orleans 
 Jeannette Knoll (L '69), associate justice of the Louisiana Supreme Court
 Malcolm Lafargue (L '32), U. S. attorney in Shreveport during the 1940s; defeated U.S. Senate candidate in 1950
 Madeleine Landrieu (L '87), dean of Loyola University New Orleans College of Law, former judge on the Louisiana Fourth Circuit Court of Appeal
 Mitch Landrieu (L), former Lieutenant Governor of Louisiana;  former Mayor of New Orleans
 Moon Landrieu (L '54), former New Orleans mayor and United States Secretary of Housing and Urban Development
 Harry Lee (L '67), former Sheriff of Jefferson Parish
 Harry T. Lemmon (L), former Judge of the Louisiana Fourth Circuit Court of Appeal, and former Justice of the Louisiana Supreme Court
Arthur A. Morrell (L), clerk of the Orleans Parish Criminal Court since 2006 and state representative for District 96, 1984-2006
 Paul Pastorek (L '79), former Louisiana state superintendent of education
 Julie Quinn (L '92), former state senator and former Jefferson Parish School Board member
 Carl E. Stewart (L '74),  Circuit Judge, and former Chief Circuit Judge, of the United States Court of Appeals for the Fifth Circuit; former judge of the Louisiana Court of Appeal for the Second Circuit
 James Sutterfield (L '67), Republican member of the Louisiana House from Orleans Parish, 1970-1972; practicing attorney in New Orleans
 Suzanne Haik Terrell (L '84),  former Louisiana Commissioner of Elections; former member of the New Orleans City Council, former candidate for the U.S. Senate, sister of Richard and Ted Haik
 Chet D. Traylor (L '74), Louisiana Supreme Court Associate Justice, 1997-2009
 Mary Ann Vial Lemmon (L' 64), federal judge, United States District Court for the Eastern District of Louisiana 
 Dennis Waldron (L'73), former judge of the Criminal District Court of New Orleans
 Louis Westerfield  (L' 74), served as the first African-American Dean of the University of Mississippi School of Law
 Robert Wilkie (L '88), former United States Assistant Secretary of Defense, former Under Secretary of Defense for Personnel and Readiness, and former United States Secretary of Veterans Affairs
 Edwin E. Willis, Member of the United States House of Representatives from Louisiana's 3rd congressional district from 1949 to 1969
 J. Skelly Wright ('32, L '34),  former federal district judge of the United States District Court for the Eastern District of Louisiana from 1950-1962, and former judge of the U.S. Court of Appeals for the District of Columbia from 1962-1988, serving as Chief Circuit Judge from 1986-1988

See also
 American Bar Association Profile

References

External links
Official site

Catholic law schools in the United States
Educational institutions established in 1914
Jesuit universities and colleges in the United States
Law schools in Louisiana
Loyola University New Orleans
1914 establishments in Louisiana